Terra baixa (meaning in English Lowlands, also known as Martha of the Lowlands) is a Catalan-language play written by Àngel Guimerà in 1896.  The drama is considered his most popular work, having become an international sensation after its premiere.

It served as the basis for three operas, among them Tiefland, by Eugen d'Albert, which in turn served as the basis for two films, including one by Leni Riefenstahl.  Six other films based directly on the play were also made.

Filmography
Terra baixa, directed by Fructuós Gelabert and  Narciso Cuyàs (Spain, 1907)
Feudalismo, directed by Alfredo Robert (Italy, 1912)
Tierra baja, directed by Mario Gallo (Argentina, 1912)
Marta of the Lowlands, directed by J. Searle Dawley (1914)
Under the Mountains, directed by Béla Balogh (Hungary, 1920, based on the opera Tiefland)
Lowlands, directed by Adolf E. Licho (Germany, 1922, based on the opera Tiefland)
Tierra baja, directed by Miguel Zacarías (Mexico, 1951)
Tiefland, directed by Leni Riefenstahl (Germany, 1940–54, based on the opera Tiefland)
Tiefland, directed by Werner Kelch (West Germany, 1964, TV film, based on the opera Tiefland)

References

1896 plays
Catalan-language plays
Plays adapted into operas
Spanish plays adapted into films